Elba Perez-Cinciarelli (July 27, 1943 – July 3, 2020) was an American politician who served in the New Jersey General Assembly from the 31st Legislative District from 2002 to 2004.

Born in San Antonio, Quebradillas, Puerto Rico, Perez-Cinciarelli moved to The Bronx and then to Jersey City, where she graduated in 1974 from Jersey City State College (which has since been renamed New Jersey City University).

She died on July 3, 2020, at age 76. She was buried at Holy Cross Cemetery in North Arlington, New Jersey.

References

1943 births
2020 deaths
Hispanic and Latino American state legislators in New Jersey
Hispanic and Latino American women in politics
Democratic Party members of the New Jersey General Assembly
New Jersey City University alumni
People from Quebradillas, Puerto Rico
American politicians of Puerto Rican descent
Politicians from the Bronx
Politicians from Jersey City, New Jersey
Women state legislators in New Jersey